The Canadian province of New Brunswick is divided into 89 local entities, consisting of 77 local governments and 12 rural districts. 

A local government can be a city, town, village, regional municipality or rural community, mainly according to population. Cities generally provide more services than smaller entities. Services include certain transportation, environmental, security, and recreational and culture services. 

Ninety five per cent of the population lives in a city, town, village, regional municipality, or rural community and can vote to elect responsible local government. Parts of the province not covered by these local governments are divided into rural districts. These are sparsely populated unincorporated areas. Each district elects councillors to form an advisory committee to advise the minister on local matters. 

Twelve regional service commissions provide services over larger areas.

History 
In 1784 New Brunswick was created via the partitioning of the Colony of Nova Scotia and divided into the counties of NB, which were in turn divided into parishes. By the 1960s the province was a patchwork of incorporated cities, towns, villages, and local improvement districts. Under this system, many public services including healthcare, social services, and education were provided by county government. Underfunded poor counties were stuck in a "perpetual cycle of poverty". 

In response, Liberal premier Louis Robichaud introduced the Equal Opportunity Program. This reformed municipal taxation, and via the 1966 Municipalities Act eliminated county governments and led to the subsequent centralization of many of their powers. In 1967 counties ceased to exist as government units and nonmunicipal incorporated bodies were converted to villages. A new governance unit, the local service district (LSD), was created to administer local services like fire departments in some rural areas. The new villages were given the same municipal powers as towns and cities. Existing cities and towns were not changed, while existing villages were converted to the new village model.

Regional service commissions were added in 2012.

The 2023 New Brunswick local governance reform was an overhaul of the system as follows:
 104 local governments were reduced to 77, primarily by combining existing municipalities. Few municipalities were unaffected by the changes, with some new municipalities created by combining LSDs.
 Local service districts were dissolved. Some joined existing or new municipalities or rural communities, while remaining LSD areas were combined to form 12 rural districts corresponding to the regional service commissions. A significant number of LSDs were split between municipalities and rural districts.
 Regional service commissions assumed increased powers; many had their boundaries adjusted.
 Land use planning was improved.
 Financing local governance finance was reformed.

Local governance divisions

Other jurisdictions of the province

Census areas 
Census Canada divides the province into census divisions and subdivisions, population centres, and economic regions (Fredericton-Moncton-Saint John, Madawaska-Charlotte, Restigouche-Albert).

Health authorities
The NB Department of Health funds two health authorities: Horizon Health Network in the central and southern portions of the province, and Vitalité Health Network in the north and southeast. For statistical purposes, the government further divides the province into seven zones, with zones 2 and 3 in the Horizon authority, and the rest under Vitalité.

Protected areas
National Parks (Fundy and Kouchibouguac) and provincial parks.
Canadian Heritage Rivers System: the Saint John, St. Croix,  and Restigouche rivers.
National Wildlife Areas and National Migratory Bird Sanctuaries administered by the Canadian Wildlife Service.
 Protected Natural Areas  legally protected under the provincial Protected Natural Areas Act.

Indian reserves 
There are 15 First Nations in New Brunswick.

Canadian Forces bases 
There is one Canadian Forces Base, CFB Gagetown.

See also 
:fr:Gouvernance locale au Nouveau-Brunswick (local government in NB)

Notes

References 

Government of New Brunswick
Geography of New Brunswick
Local government in New Brunswick